Shean Garlito y Romo (born 19 February 1994) is a Belgian professional footballer who plays for Differdange 03 in the Luxembourg National Division as a midfielder.

External links

1994 births
Living people
Belgian footballers
Association football midfielders
A.F.C. Tubize players
R.W.D. Molenbeek players
FC Differdange 03 players
Challenger Pro League players
Luxembourg National Division players
Belgian expatriate footballers
Belgian expatriate sportspeople in Luxembourg
Expatriate footballers in Luxembourg
RWDM47 players